West Bank Light, officially West Bank Front Range Light, is a lighthouse in Lower New York Bay, within New York City, and acts as the front range light for the Ambrose Channel. It is currently active and not open to the public. The tower was built in 1901 and heightened in 1908. Staten Island Light serves as the rearrange.

On May 29, 2007, the Secretary of the Interior identified West Bank Light, offshore in Ambrose Channel–Lower New York Bay, as surplus under the National Historic Lighthouse Preservation Act of 2000. It could be seen as far as the Riegelmann Boardwalk in Coney Island, Brooklyn, as well as from South Beach, Staten Island.

No group was identified as willing and able to preserve the West Bank Light, and on June 5, 2008, the General Services Administration placed the light up for sale via auction with an initial bid was $10,000. The auction ended on August 27, 2008 at a final bid of $245,000. The sale did not close, and the light was auctioned a second time in September 2010, selling for $195,000 to Sheridan Reilly.

References

External links

 Lighthouse Friends site
 National Park Service Historic Lighthouses
 

Lighthouses completed in 1901
Lighthouses on the National Register of Historic Places in New York City
National Register of Historic Places in Staten Island
Lighthouses in Staten Island
1901 establishments in New York City